Daredevil may refer to:

 A stunt performer

Arts and media

Comics
 Daredevil (Lev Gleason Publications), a fictional 1940s superhero popularized by writer-artist Charles Biro
 Daredevil (Marvel Comics character), a Marvel comic book superhero 
 Daredevil (Marvel Comics series), the comic series about the Marvel character
 Daredevil: The Man Without Fear, a graphic novel by Frank Miller
 Daredevil (film), a 2003 film starring Ben Affleck as the Marvel character
 Daredevil: The Album, the soundtrack album to the film
 Daredevil (video game), based on the film
 Daredevil (TV series), a 2015 Netflix series starring Charlie Cox as the Marvel character
 Daredevil (Marvel Cinematic Universe), based on the Marvel Comics character, as portrayed by Charlie Cox
 The Daredevils, a Marvel UK comic

Film
 The Daredevil (1920 film), a lost American comedy western film directed by and starring Tom Mix
 The Daredevil, a 1931 German film

Gaming
 Daredevils (role-playing game), a 1982 pulp pen-and-paper role-playing game
 Daredevil Comet, a type of Prankster Comet from the video game Super Mario Galaxy

Literature
 Daredevil (novel), a 1929 novel by Leslie Charteris
 Daredevils (The Hardy Boys), a novel in the book series The Hardy Boys

Music
 Daredevils (band), a band formed by Bad Religion guitarist Brett Gurewitz
 Daredevil (Fu Manchu album), 1995
 Daredevil (Justin Rutledge album), 2014
 "Daredevil", a song from Fiona Apple's album The Idler Wheel...

Sport
 Butte Daredevils, an American basketball team, active 2006–08
 Delhi Daredevils, an Indian cricket franchise, founded 2008
 Denver Daredevils, an American roller hockey team, active 1996
 Indianapolis Daredevils, an American soccer club, active 1974–79
 Outer Banks Daredevils, an American baseball team, founded 1997

See also